The following elections occurred in the year 2002.

 2002 Bahraini parliamentary election
 2002 Comorian presidential election
 2002 East Timorese presidential election
 2002 Fijian municipal election
 2002 Hong Kong Chief Executive election
 2002 Malagasy parliamentary election
 2002 New Zealand general election
 2002 Seychellois parliamentary election
 2002 South Korean presidential election
 2002 Tongan general election
 2002 Tuvaluan general election

Africa
 2002 Zimbabwe presidential election
 51st National Conference of the African National Congress
 2002 Algerian legislative election
 2002 Burkinabé parliamentary election
 2002 Cameroonian parliamentary election
 2002 Chadian parliamentary election
 2002 Equatorial Guinean presidential election
 2002 Gambian parliamentary election
 2002 Guinean legislative election
 2002 Kenyan general election
 2002 Lesotho general election
 2002 Malian parliamentary election
 2002 Malian presidential election
 2002 Moroccan parliamentary election
 2002 Republic of the Congo parliamentary election
 2002 Republic of the Congo presidential election
 2002 São Tomé and Príncipe legislative election
 2002 Sierra Leonean general election
 2002 Togolese parliamentary election
 2002 Zimbabwean presidential election

Asia
 2002 Bahraini parliamentary election
 2002 East Timorese presidential election
 2002 Hong Kong Chief Executive election
 2002 Indian presidential election
 2002 Laotian parliamentary election
 2002 Nagorno-Karabakh presidential election
 2002 Pakistani general election
 2002 South Korean presidential election

India

 2002 Gujarat Legislative Assembly election
 2002 Indian presidential election
 2002 Punjab Legislative Assembly election
 2002 Uttar Pradesh Legislative Assembly election
 2002 Uttarakhand Legislative Assembly election

Iraq
 2002 Iraqi presidential referendum

Japan
 2002 Amagasaki mayoral election

Philippines
 2002 Philippine barangay and Sangguniang Kabataan elections

Australia
 2002 Cunningham by-election
 2002 Hornsby state by-election
 2002 South Australian state election
 2002 Tasmanian state election
 2002 Victorian state election

Europe
 2002 Abkhazian parliamentary election
 2002 Albanian presidential election
 2002 Bosnia and Herzegovina general election
 2002 Czech legislative election
 2002 Danderyd municipal election
 2002 Faroese parliamentary election
 2002 Fine Gael leadership election
 2002 Gibraltar sovereignty referendum
 2002 Greek local elections
 2002 Hungarian parliamentary election
 2002 Irish general election
 2002 Ivano-Frankivsk Oblast local election
 2002 Jersey general election
 2002 Latvian parliamentary election
 2002–2003 Lithuanian presidential election
 2002 Macedonian parliamentary election
 2002 Montenegrin parliamentary election
 2002 Montenegrin presidential election
 2002 Nagorno-Karabakh presidential election
 2002 Pajala municipal election
 2002 Portuguese legislative election
 December 2002 Serbian presidential election
 Serbian presidential election, September–October 2002
 2002 Slovak parliamentary election
 2002 Slovenian presidential election
 2002 Stockholm municipal election
 2002 Swedish county council elections
 2002 Swedish general election
 2002 Swedish municipal elections
 2002 Turkish general election
 2002 Ukrainian parliamentary election

Austria
 2002 Austrian legislative election

France
 2002 French legislative election
 2002 French presidential election

Germany
 2002 German federal election
 2002 Mecklenburg-Vorpommern state election
 2002 Saxony-Anhalt state election

Netherlands
 2002 Labour Party (Netherlands) leadership election
 2002 Dutch general election

Turkey
 2002 Turkish general election
 2002 Cihanbeyli by-election

United Kingdom
 2002 United Kingdom local elections
 2002 Ogmore by-election

United Kingdom local
 2002 United Kingdom local elections

English local
 2002 Worthing Council election
 2002 Adur Council election
 2002 Amber Valley Council election
 2002 Barking and Dagenham Council election
 2002 Barnet Council election
 2002 Barrow-in-Furness Council election
 2002 Bolton Council election
 2002 Brent Council election
 2002 Brentwood Council election
 2002 Bromley Council election
 2002 Broxbourne Council election
 2002 Burnley Council election
 2002 Calderdale Council election
 2002 Camden Council election
 2002 Cheltenham Council election
 2002 Cherwell Council election
 2002 Chorley Council election
 2002 Craven Council election
 2002 Croydon Council election
 2002 Daventry Council election
 2002 Derby Council election
 2002 Eastleigh Council election
 2002 Ellesmere Port and Neston Council election
 2002 Epping Forest Council election
 2002 Fareham Council election
 2002 Gateshead Council election
 2002 Gosport Council election
 2002 Greenwich Council election
 2002 Halton Council election
 2002 Harlow Council election
 2002 Hart Council election
 2002 Hartlepool Council election
 2002 Hastings Council election
 2002 Hull Council election
 2002 Hyndburn Council election
 2002 Ipswich Borough Council election
 2002 Kingston upon Thames Council election
 2002 Knowsley Council election
 2002 Lambeth Council election
 2002 Leeds Council election
 2002 Lewisham Council election
 2002 Lincoln Council election
 2002 Liverpool Council election
 2002 Manchester Council election
 2002 Mole Valley Council election
 2002 Newcastle-under-Lyme Council election
 2002 Newham Council election
 2002 Nuneaton and Bedworth Council election
 2002 Oxford City Council election
 2002 Penwith Council election
 2002 Portsmouth Council election
 2002 Preston Council election
 2002 Purbeck Council election
 2002 Redditch Council election
 2002 Rochdale Council election
 2002 Rochford Council election
 2002 Rossendale Council election
 2002 Rugby Council election
 2002 Runnymede Council election
 2002 Rushmoor Council election
 2002 Salford Council election
 2002 Sefton Council election
 2002 Solihull Council election
 2002 South Lakeland Council election
 2002 South Tyneside Council election
 2002 Southend-on-Sea Council election
 2002 Southwark Council election
 2002 St Albans Council election
 2002 St Helens Council election
 2002 Stevenage Council election
 2002 Stratford-on-Avon Council election
 2002 Swindon Council election
 2002 Tamworth Council election
 2002 Tandridge Council election
 2002 Three Rivers Council election
 2002 Thurrock Council election
 2002 Tower Hamlets Council election
 2002 Trafford Council election
 2002 Tunbridge Wells Council election
 2002 Wakefield Council election
 2002 Waltham Forest Council election
 2002 Wandsworth Council election
 2002 Watford Council election
 2002 Waveney Council election
 2002 Welwyn Hatfield Council election
 2002 West Lancashire Council election
 2002 West Lindsey Council election
 2002 Weymouth and Portland Council election
 2002 Wigan Council election
 2002 Winchester Council election
 2002 Wirral Council election
 2002 Woking Council election
 2002 Wokingham Council election
 2002 Wolverhampton Council election
 2002 Worcester Council election
 2002 Wyre Forest Council election

Japan
 2002 Amagasaki mayoral election

New Zealand general
 List of electorates in the New Zealand general election, 2002, by party vote
 2002 New Zealand general election

North America

Canada
 2002 British Columbia aboriginal treaty referendum
 2002 Manitoba municipal elections
 2002 New Democratic Party of Prince Edward Island leadership election
 2002 Quebec municipal elections
 2002 Quebec provincial by-elections
 2002 Vancouver municipal election
 2002 Cowansville municipal election
 2002 Victoria municipal election
 2002 Winnipeg municipal election
 2002 Yukon general election

Caribbean
 2002 Bahamian general election
 2002 Dominican Republic parliamentary election
 2002 Jamaican general election
 2002 Trinidad and Tobago general election

United States
 2002 United States Senate elections
 2002 United States House of Representatives elections
 2002 United States elections

United States gubernatorial
 2002 United States gubernatorial elections
 2002 Alabama gubernatorial election
 2002 Alaska gubernatorial election
 2002 Arizona gubernatorial election
 2002 Arkansas gubernatorial election
 2002 California gubernatorial election
 2002 Colorado gubernatorial election
 2002 Connecticut gubernatorial election
 2002 Florida gubernatorial election
 2002 Georgia gubernatorial election
 2002 Idaho gubernatorial election
 2002 Illinois gubernatorial election
 2002 Iowa gubernatorial election
 2002 Maine gubernatorial election
 2002 Maryland gubernatorial election
 2002 Michigan gubernatorial election
 2002 Minnesota gubernatorial election
 2002 New Mexico gubernatorial election
 2002 New York gubernatorial election
 2002 Oklahoma gubernatorial election
 2002 Oregon gubernatorial election
 2002 Pennsylvania gubernatorial election
 2002 Rhode Island gubernatorial election
 2002 South Carolina gubernatorial election
 2002 South Dakota gubernatorial election
 2002 Texas gubernatorial election
 2002 Wisconsin gubernatorial election

United States mayoral
 2002 New Orleans mayoral election
 2002 Washington, D.C. mayoral election

Arizona
 2002 Arizona gubernatorial election

Arkansas
 2002 Arkansas gubernatorial election

California
 2002 California state elections
 2002 California Attorney General election
 2002 California gubernatorial election
 2002 California Insurance Commissioner election
 2002 California Secretary of State election
 2002 California State Controller election
 2002 California State Treasurer election
 2002 California Superintendent of Public Instruction election
 2002 California lieutenant gubernatorial election
 2002 California Courts of Appeal elections
 2002 San Francisco Board of Supervisors elections
 2002 California State Senate elections
 2002 California State Assembly elections

Florida
 2002 Florida gubernatorial election

Georgia (U.S. state)
 2002 Georgia gubernatorial election
 United States House of Representatives elections in Georgia, 2002

Guam
 2002 Guamanian general election

Hawaii
 2002 Hawaii gubernatorial election

Illinois
 2002 Illinois gubernatorial election
 United States Senate election in Illinois, 2002

Kansas
 2002 Kansas gubernatorial election
 United States Senate election in Kansas, 2002

Louisiana
 2002 New Orleans mayoral election
 United States Senate election in Louisiana, 2002

Maryland
 2002 Maryland gubernatorial election

Massachusetts
 2002 Massachusetts general election
 2002 Massachusetts gubernatorial election
 United States Senate election in Massachusetts, 2002

Michigan
 2002 Michigan gubernatorial election
 United States Senate election in Michigan, 2002

Montana
 United States Senate election in Montana, 2002

New Hampshire
 2002 New Hampshire Senate election phone jamming scandal
 United States Senate election in New Hampshire, 2002

New Mexico
 2002 New Mexico gubernatorial election
 United States Senate election in New Mexico, 2002

New York
 2002 New York state elections
 2002 New York gubernatorial election
 2002 New York Comptroller election
 2002 New York attorney general election
 United States House of Representatives elections in New York, 2002

North Carolina
 2002 North Carolina General Assembly election
 2002 North Carolina House of Representatives election
 2002 North Carolina Senate election
 2002 North Carolina judicial elections
 United States House of Representatives elections in North Carolina, 2002
 United States Senate election in North Carolina, 2002

Oklahoma
 2002 Oklahoma state elections
 2002 Oklahoma gubernatorial election
 United States Senate election in Oklahoma, 2002

Oregon
 2002 Oregon gubernatorial election
 United States Senate election in Oregon, 2002

Pennsylvania
 2002 Pennsylvania gubernatorial election
 2002 Pennsylvania lieutenant gubernatorial election
 2002 Pennsylvania House of Representatives elections
 2002 Pennsylvania Senate elections
 2002 Pennsylvania state elections
 United States House of Representatives elections in Pennsylvania, 2002

Rhode Island
 2002 Rhode Island gubernatorial election

South Dakota
 United States House of Representatives election in South Dakota, 2002
 2002 South Dakota gubernatorial election
 United States Senate election in South Dakota, 2002

Tennessee
 United States Senate election in Tennessee, 2002

United States House of Representatives
 2002 United States House of Representatives elections
 United States House of Representatives elections in California, 2002
 United States House of Representatives elections in Georgia, 2002
 United States House of Representatives elections in Indiana, 2002
 United States House of Representatives elections in New York, 2002
 United States House of Representatives election in North Dakota, 2002
 United States House of Representatives elections in South Carolina, 2002
 United States House of Representatives election in South Dakota, 2002

United States Senate
 United States Senate election in Alaska, 2002
 United States Senate election in Arkansas, 2002
 United States Senate election in Colorado, 2002
 United States Senate election in Delaware, 2002
 United States Senate election in Idaho, 2002
 United States Senate election in Illinois, 2002
 United States Senate election in Iowa, 2002
 United States Senate election in Kansas, 2002
 United States Senate election in Kentucky, 2002
 United States Senate election in Louisiana, 2002
 Charles McGee
 United States Senate election in Maine, 2002
 United States Senate election in Massachusetts, 2002
 United States Senate election in Michigan, 2002
 United States Senate election in Minnesota, 2002
 United States Senate election in Mississippi, 2002
 United States Senate special election in Missouri, 2002
 United States Senate election in Montana, 2002
 United States Senate election in Nebraska, 2002
 United States Senate election in New Hampshire, 2002
 2002 New Hampshire Senate election phone jamming scandal
 United States Senate election in New Mexico, 2002
 United States Senate election in North Carolina, 2002
 United States Senate election in Oklahoma, 2002
 United States Senate election in Oregon, 2002
 United States Senate election in Rhode Island, 2002
 United States Senate election in South Carolina, 2002
 United States Senate election in South Dakota, 2002
 United States Senate election in Tennessee, 2002
 United States Senate election in Texas, 2002
 2002 United States Senate elections
 United States Senate election in Georgia, 2002
 United States Senate election in New Jersey, 2002
 United States Senate election in Virginia, 2002
 United States Senate election in West Virginia, 2002
 United States Senate election in Wyoming, 2002

Virginia
 United States Senate election in Virginia, 2002

Washington, D.C.
 2002 Washington, D.C. mayoral election

West Virginia
 United States Senate election in West Virginia, 2002

Wisconsin
 2002 Wisconsin gubernatorial election

Wyoming
 United States Senate election in Wyoming, 2002

Oceania
 2002 Fijian municipal election
 2002 New Zealand general election
 2002 Niuean general election
 2002 Papua New Guinean general election
 2002 Penrhyn by-election
 2002 Tongan general election
 2002 Vanuatuan general election
 2002 Wallis and Futuna Territorial Assembly election

Australia
 2002 Cunningham by-election
 2002 Hornsby state by-election
 2002 South Australian state election
 2002 Tasmanian state election
 2002 Victorian state election

Guam
 2002 Guamanian general election

Hawaii
 2002 Hawaii gubernatorial election

New Zealand
 2002 New Zealand general election

New Zealand general
 List of electorates in the New Zealand general election, 2002, by party vote
 2002 New Zealand general election

South America
 2002 Bolivian presidential election
 2002 Brazilian general election
 2002 Colombian legislative election
 2002 Colombian presidential election
 2002 Ecuadorian general election

See also

 
2002
Elections